Chaetolopha incurvata is a moth in the family Geometridae. It is found in India and Taiwan.

References

Moths described in 1888
Larentiinae
Moths of Asia